Conny Schmalfuss (born October 29, 1975 in Schwedt, Brandenburg) is a female diver from Germany, who won her first international medal (a bronze) at the 1991 European Championships in Athens, Greece in the women's 1 m springboard.

Schmalfuss competed for Germany in two consecutive Summer Olympics, starting in 2000. She was affiliated with the Berliner Turn- und Sportclub in Berlin, and formed a pair in the synchro event with Ditte Kotzian.

References

1975 births
Living people
Sportspeople from Schwedt
German female divers
Divers at the 2000 Summer Olympics
Divers at the 2004 Summer Olympics
Olympic divers of Germany
World Aquatics Championships medalists in diving
Universiade medalists in diving
Universiade silver medalists for Germany
Medalists at the 2001 Summer Universiade
Medalists at the 2003 Summer Universiade
21st-century German women
20th-century German women